Lola the Vamp (born Lola Montgomery) is an Australian dancer and part of the neo-burlesque movement. She is the only burlesque performer in theatrical history to perform burlesque as part of her submission for a PhD. She completed a creative component Ph.D. involving the production of creative product and thesis at Griffith University in Queensland.
Her performance history began at the Neo-Burlesque festival, Tease-o-rama, in 2002. She has performed at Go Go Burlesco in Sydney, the Edinburgh Fringe, The Big Day Out, Woodford Folk Festival, Valley Fiesta and solo tours of the East Coast of Australia. She co-founded 34b Burlesque in Sydney in 2005, making regular appearances until its closure in 2012. She was the Australian Penthouse Pet of the Month in November 2007. In 2008 and 2012 she was a headliner of Tease-o-rama. From 2009 to 2011 she operated Dr Sketchy's Anti-Art School in Brisbane. She has performed at the Australian Burlesque Festival every year since 2010 and headlined in 2013.  She has also appeared in music videos and films. In 2013, she joined Australian band, Desert Blues Cartel as a guest singer and performer. They released the single, Ma Cherie, in 2014, and Lola also heads her own band, Irresolute. Lola headlined the Perth International Burlesque Festival 2015

Early life and education
Lola Montgomery studied acting, ballet and tap-dance, horseriding, dressage, flute, piccolo, and piano from the age of 5. She completed her high school education through Brisbane School of Distance Education in Queensland, Australia, due to extended periods of travel as a child. 
Montgomery was a child model with Pam Tamblyn Model Management.
She completed her Bachelor of Arts (Creative Arts) degree, with majors in Theatre, Visual Art and Music at Griffith University graduating with First Class Honours. She presented papers and performances at Tease-o-rama (2003, 2005) at A Stacked Deck (Canberra Fringe Festival 2009) and The Beyond Burlesque Symposium La Trobe University at the Australian Centre for the Moving Image (2009). In 2012 she presented at the annual Australian Women's and Gender Studies conference at University of New South Wales.

Career

Burlesque
Lola began her career in 2002 at Tease-o-rama's Evangeline Auditions in San Francisco, where she performed her first strip for Dita Von Teese, among others. She improvised to an authentic New Orleans burlesque song and adopted 'The Vamp'. She is the only Australian Tease-o-rama headliner and the first Australian burlesque dancer to perform at Miss Exotic World, now called Burlesque Hall of Fame. A 2008 performance at Melbourne's Butterfly Club was described by The Age as displaying "A highly developed aesthetic and a sly wit ... super sexy without ever being tawdry, Lola is in a league of her own" (The Age, September 2008) Lola's influences include the Art Nouveau aesthetics of the Belle Epoque era, Giorgio Agamben's fetishism and the classic striptease of mid-20th century burlesque. She is known for highly referenced sets, ballet-influenced choreography and high production values. (The Happy Stripper, Jackie Willson, 2008)

She has also performed at the Edinburgh Fringe The Times the five women have some idea about showbiz so the whole thing rattles on with well-rehearsed panache. Exquisitely dressed (and undressed), it does not hurt that the five are all quite ravishing to look at' (The Times, 10 August 2005), 'Moreover, and this is rare in the realm of modern strip'n'show cabaret, the show tries to capture something of the original burlesque tradition - Lola The Vamp's exotic dance with floaty scarves is one instance' (The Herald, 27 August 2005), 'Lola's feather and fan dances were beautifully erotic' (Hairline Highlights, 17 August 2005). Subsequent major shows include The Big Day Out, Woodford Folk Festival, Valley Fiesta and solo tours of the East Coast of Australia. She was the Australian Penthouse Pet in November 2007 and supported Nick Cave and Grinderman on their Australian performances in 2007. In 2008 and 2012 she was a headliner of Tease-o-rama alongside Cirque Du Soleil, Catherine D'lish, Dirty Martini and Kitten on the Keys. From 2009 to 2011 she operated Dr Sketchy's Anti-Art School in Brisbane, a franchise owned by illustrator Molly Crabapple. She has performed at the Australian Burlesque Festival every year since 2010 and headlined in 2013. Lola also headlined the Perth International Burlesque Festival in 2015.

In 2013, she launched Vamp & Burn, a touring show featuring improvised burlesque to the music of Desert Blues Cartel.

Film
Montgomery trained as an actress and has appeared in several short films, including The Poor Slob and The Good Fairy (Cannes Short Film Corner 2007), based on an 1899 cabaret script by Alphonse Allais. This film became part of her 2007 solo tour and continues to tour arts festivals. She directed the 2012 Dick Desert video clip Where Ya Mama, screening on the Rage television program on ABC1.

References

Further reading
 "Vamp & Burn: New Orleans Burlesque" http://www.beat.com.au/arts/vamp-burn-new-orleans-burlesque
 "Lola The Vamp: Student Gains PhD Performing Striptease" http://www.huffingtonpost.co.uk/2013/12/05/student-lola-the-vamp-gains-phd-striptease-burlesque_n_4389801.html
 "Performing Burlesque Four Your PhD" http://www.thisiscabaret.com/performing-burlesque-for-your-phd-why-would-you-do-it/
 "Lola Montgomery" http://nofibs.com.au/lola-montgomery/
 "Lola The Vamp: Business, Unicorns and Richard Branson" http://conversationswithbianca.com/2011/09/19/lola-the-vamp/
 The Happy Stripper: Politics and Pleasures of the New Burlesque by Dr Jacki Willson
 "Seduce Your Lover for Valentine's Day" http://www.ladylux.com/articles/seduction-101-learn-the-art-of-burlesque/
 Burlesque and The New Bump and Grind by Michelle Baldwin, Schiffer Press, 2004.
 www.drsketchy.com
 "Lola The Vamp" by Meghann Montgomery Spring 2006 edition of The Next Big Thing 
 Burlesque Stripped Bare The Age M Magazine March 10, 2007, by Melinda Houston
 "Adapting Femininities: The New Burlesque" Debra Fereday 
 "(Auto)Theorizing the maternal interval: Burlesque performance as research by Lola Montgomery

External links
 Photographs on Flickr
 Personal website

Living people
Australian female erotic dancers
Australian neo-burlesque performers
Year of birth missing (living people)